Call of the Wild is the third studio album by singer Lee Aaron, released on June 27, 1985 through Attic Records; a remastered edition was reissued in 2002 through Unidisc Music. The album reached #86 on the RPM Canadian Albums Chart on August 24, 1985 and remained on the chart for twelve weeks.
The title track, "Call of the Wild", was included on a 1988 reissue but not included on the original album which bore the same title. It was, however, included on the B-side of the 12-inch single of "Barely Holdin' On".

Track listing

Personnel
Lee Aaron – lead vocals, background vocals
John Albani – guitar, background vocals
Simon Brierley – guitar
Bob Ezrin – keyboard, percussion, executive production
Jerry Mercer – drums
Spider Sinnaeve – bass
Chris Brockway – background vocals
Walter Zwolinski – background vocals
Dick Wagner – background vocals
Lenny DeRose – engineering, mixing
Mick Walsh – engineering
Kevin Markland – engineering
Wayne O' Brien – engineering
Randy Staub – engineering
Paul Gross – production

Chart performance

References

Lee Aaron albums
1985 albums
Attic Records albums
Albums produced by Bob Ezrin